Maureen Bonar; (born 1962 or 1963 in Deloraine, Manitoba) is a Canadian curler. Bonar is a four time provincial champion- twice as a skip.

In 2009 Bonar was inducted into the Manitoba Curling Hall of Fame.

Curling career 
After having won the 1982 provincial junior championships as skip, Bonar joined up with Patti Vande as her lead and won the 1983 provincial championships earning them the right to represent Manitoba at the 1983 Scott Tournament of Hearts. The team finished 6-4, and out of the playoffs.

Ten years later, Bonar won her second provincial championships - this time as skip. At the 1993 Scott Tournament of Hearts, Bonar lost in the final to Saskatchewan's Sandra Schmirler (then Peterson).

Bonar won her third provincial championships in 1996. At the 1996 Scott Tournament of Hearts, Bonar finished 6-5 and lost in a tie-breaker against her provincial rivals, team Connie Laliberte who won the Hearts the year before. In 1997, Laliberte had Bonar join her team as an alternate in their failed attempt to qualify for the 1998 Winter Olympics.

Bonar won her last provincial championships in 2004 playing second for Lois Fowler. The team lost in the semi-final to Marie-France Larouche of Quebec at the 2004 Scott Tournament of Hearts.

References

External links
 

Curlers from Manitoba
Living people
Canadian women curlers
Year of birth uncertain
1960s births
20th-century Canadian women